Bolaji is a Yoruba given name and surname meaning "Wakes with wealth". Notable people with the surname include:

Given name

 Bolaji Abdullahi, Nigerian politician
 Bolaji Akinyemi, Nigerian professor of political science who was Nigerian External Affairs Minister from 1985 to late 1987
 Bolaji Aluko, Nigerian academic
 Bolaji Amusan, Nigerian actor
 Bolaji Ayinla, Nigerian politician
 Bolaji Badejo, Nigerian visual artist and actor 
 Bolaji Dada, Nigerian politician
 Bolaji Idowu, Nigerian cleric
 Bolaji Odofin, Nigerian playwright
 Bolaji Ogunmola, Nigerian actress
 Bolaji Owasanoye, Nigerian lawyer, human rights activist and chairman of Independent Corrupt Practices Commission
 Bolaji Ramos, Nigerian writer
 Bolaji Sakin, Nigerian football 

Surname

 Adebayo Bolaji, Nigerian painter, actor, writer and director
 Omoseye Bolaji, Nigerian writer

References

Yoruba-language surnames